The riparian antbird (Cercomacroides fuscicauda) is a species of passerine bird in the family Thamnophilidae.
It is found in southern Colombia, eastern Ecuador, eastern Peru, northern Bolivia and southwestern Amazonian Brazil.  Its natural habitats are subtropical or tropical moist lowland forests, and adjacent thickets on sandbars and riverbanks.

The riparian antbird used to be considered conspecific with the blackish antbird but the two taxa were split based their different vocalization. The riparian antbird was formerly included in the genus Cercomacra. A molecular phylogenetic study published in 2014 found that Cercomacra, as then defined, was polyphyletic. The genus was split to create two monophyletic genera and six species including the riparian antbird were moved to the newly erected genus Cercomacroides.

References

riparian antbird
Birds of the Amazon Basin
Birds of the Ecuadorian Amazon
Birds of the Peruvian Amazon
Birds of the Bolivian Amazon
riparian antbird
riparian antbird